El Reno is a city in the U.S. state of Oklahoma.

El Reno may also refer to:

 El Reno High School
 El Reno Hotel
 El Reno Regional Airport, near the city
 Lake El Reno, a reservoir near the city
 El Reno Group, a geologic group in Oklahoma
 2013 El Reno tornado, a tornado that affected the area around the aforementioned city

See also
 Reno (disambiguation)